The Travel Air 1000 was an American single-engined biplane, the first product of the newly formed Travel Air Manufacturing Company of Wichita, Kansas. It led to a line of Travel Air biplanes produced until 1930 when the company was bought by Curtiss-Wright.

Design and development
The Travel Air Company was formed in early 1925. The Travel Air 1000 was the first design by the company. A conventional biplane with two open cockpits in tandem, with the pilot at the rear. It was powered by a  Curtiss OX-5 engine and had a conventional landing gear with a tailskid. The Travel Air 1000 registered NC241 first flew on 13 March 1925 flown by Walter Beech. With some minor changes it was developed into the Travel Air 2000.

Aircraft on display
The Travel Air 1000 is owned by the Experimental Aircraft Association and is on display at the Beechcraft Heritage Museum in Tullahoma, Tennessee.

Specifications

References

Notes

Bibliography

1920s United States civil utility aircraft
Single-engined tractor aircraft
1000
Biplanes
Aircraft first flown in 1925